Steven C. Voorhees (born c. 1955) is an American business executive. He was the chief executive officer of WestRock.

Early life
Voorhees was born circa 1955. He graduated from Northwestern University, where he earned a bachelor's degree, and he earned a master in business administration from the University of Virginia Darden School of Business in 1980.

Career
Voorhees worked for Sonat from 1980 to 1999. He served as the chief executive officer of WestRock from 2015 to March 2021.

Voorhees serves on the board of directors of SunTrust Banks.

Civic activities
Voorhees is a donor to UVA's Darden School, where the Voorhees Study Group Room is named for him.

References

Living people
Northwestern University alumni
University of Virginia Darden School of Business alumni
American chief executives
American corporate directors
SunTrust Banks people
Year of birth missing (living people)